The following radio stations broadcast on AM frequency 1660 kHz: 1660 AM is a Regional broadcast frequency.

Argentina
 LRI232 in Nogoya, Entre Rios

United States
All stations operate with 10 kW during the daytime and are Class B stations.

External links

 Radio Locator list of stations on 1660
 FCC list of radio stations on 1660 kHz

References

Lists of radio stations by frequency